Baveleh-ye Sofla (also Romanized as Bāveleh-ye Soflá; also known as Bāveleh-ye Pā'īn) is a village in Mangur-e Gharbi Rural District, in the Central District of Piranshahr County, West Azerbaijan Province, Iran. At the 2006 census, its population was 45, in 6 families.

References 

Populated places in Piranshahr County